Xəlilabad (also, Xililabad and Khalilabad) is a village and municipality in the Jalilabad Rayon of Azerbaijan.  It has a population of 1,372.

References 

Populated places in Jalilabad District (Azerbaijan)